William Ponsonby, 2nd Earl of Bessborough  (1704 – 11 March 1793) was a British politician and public servant. He was an Irish and English peer and member of the House of Lords (styled Hon. William Ponsonby from 1723 to 1739 and Viscount Duncannon from 1739 to 1758). He served in both the Irish and the British House of Commons, before entering the House of Lords, and held office as a Lord Commissioner of the Admiralty, Lord Commissioner of the Treasury, and as Postmaster General of the United Kingdom. He was also a Privy Counsellor, Chief Secretary for Ireland and Earl of Bessborough.

Education

Ponsonby was educated at Trinity College, Dublin.

Political life

In 1725 Ponsonby was returned to the Irish House of Commons for Newtownards and in 1727 for County Kilkenny, holding the seat until 1758, when his father died and he took his father's titles. From 1741 to 1745, he served as Chief Secretary for Ireland under his father-in-law, then Lord Lieutenant of Ireland.

As Viscount Duncannon, Ponsonby was first appointed a Lord Commissioner of the Admiralty on 27 June 1746, a position he held until 1756, when he was appointed a Lord Commissioner of the Treasury. He also represented the British constituencies of Derby from 1742 to 1754, Saltash from 1754 to 1756 and Harwick from 1756 to 1758. Upon the death of his father on 4 July 1758, Ponsonby succeeded him in the House of Lords under the title Baron Ponsonby of Sysonby on 23 November of that year.

Postmaster General
On 2 June 1759 Ponsonby left the Treasury and was appointed Postmaster General of Great Britain jointly with Robert Hampden-Trevor, 1st Viscount Hampden. He resigned the position when his brother-in-law, William Cavendish, 4th Duke of Devonshire, was dismissed as Lord Chamberlain in October 1762. He was reappointed to the position (and sworn of the Privy Council) in July 1765 jointly with Thomas Robinson, 1st Baron Grantham, until he resigned in 1766, his initial offer to resign having been refused.

Upon William Ponsonby's death on 11 March 1793 his son, Frederick Ponsonby, succeeded to his titles.

Family

William Ponsonby was the son of Brabazon Ponsonby, 1st Earl of Bessborough, and his wife Sarah Margetson, and elder brother of John Ponsonby.

On 5 July 1739, William married Lady Caroline Cavendish, eldest daughter of William Cavendish, 3rd Duke of Devonshire, who died in 1760 aged 40.

They had three surviving children:
 Lady Catherine Ponsonby (b. 1742), married Aubrey Beauclerk, 5th Duke of St Albans
 Lady Charlotte Ponsonby (b. 1747), married William Fitzwilliam, 4th Earl Fitzwilliam
 Frederick Ponsonby, 3rd Earl of Bessborough (1758–1844)

Parkstead House, Roehampton, was built in 1750 for William Ponsonby, and now forms part of Roehampton University.

References

External links

 ODNB article

1704 births
1793 deaths
Duncannon, William Ponsonby, Viscount
Duncannon, William Ponsonby, Viscount
Duncannon, William Ponsonby, Viscount
Ponsonby, William
Duncannon, William Ponsonby, Viscount
Duncannon, William Ponsonby, Viscount
Members of the Privy Council of Great Britain
Members of the Privy Council of Ireland
United Kingdom Postmasters General
Members of the Parliament of Great Britain for English constituencies
Chief Secretaries for Ireland
Members of the Parliament of Great Britain for constituencies in Derbyshire
Members of the Parliament of Ireland (pre-1801) for County Down constituencies
Members of the Parliament of Ireland (pre-1801) for County Kilkenny constituencies
William
William
Alumni of Trinity College Dublin